Mark Elliot Rogers (born January 30, 1986) is an American former professional baseball pitcher.

Career
He was drafted by Milwaukee as the 5th overall pick in the first round of the 2004 amateur entry draft out of Mt. Ararat High School in Topsham, Maine, where he was coached by Bob Neron, and his father Craig. In 2004, he played for the Rookie league Arizona Brewers. He was promoted to the Class A West Virginia Power in 2005. Rogers split the 2006 season between Arizona and the Class A-Advanced Brevard County Manatees.

In July 2006, Rogers injured his right shoulder and underwent surgery to repair a torn labrum. In June 2007, he had scar tissue removed as a result of the first surgery. After rehabbing for the entire 2008 season, Rogers returned to the field for Brevard County in 2009. Rogers played the majority of the 2010 season with the Double-A Huntsville Stars, but also played one game for the Triple-A Nashville Sounds. On September 10, he was recalled by the Brewers, making his major league debut in that evening's game.

On August 19, 2011, Major League Baseball announced that Rogers had been suspended for 25 games "due to a second positive test for a stimulant in violation of Major League Baseball's Joint Drug Prevention and Treatment Program".

On July 29, 2012, Rogers returned to the major leagues to replace Zack Greinke in the starting rotation after he was traded to the Los Angeles Angels of Anaheim.

Rogers, during his call-up, went 3–1 with a 3.92 ERA, striking out 41 batters in 39 innings.

Rogers signed a minor league deal with the Seattle Mariners on January 24, 2014. He was released in May after two games in AAA. He then signed a minor league contract with the Texas Rangers, and was released on March 31.

References

External links

Brewerfan.net profile

1986 births
Living people
Baseball players from Maine
Major League Baseball pitchers
Milwaukee Brewers players
Arizona League Brewers players
West Virginia Power players
Brevard County Manatees players
Huntsville Stars players
Nashville Sounds players
Tacoma Rainiers players
Lancaster Barnstormers players
People from Brunswick, Maine
Peoria Javelinas players
Bravos de Margarita players
American expatriate baseball players in Venezuela
Long Island Ducks players
Bridgeport Bluefish players
People from Topsham, Maine